Taishan Station is the fourth of the four Chinese research stations in Antarctica.

Officially opened on February 8, 2014, it is the fourth Chinese research station in Antarctica following Great Wall, Zhongshan and Kunlun stations.

The site is located 2,621 m above sea level in Princess Elizabeth Land, 522 km and 600 km to Zhongshan and Kunlun stations respectively. One of its functions is to serve as a relay point between the two stations.

The construction started on December 26, 2013. The station's main building covers an area of 410 m², together with the auxiliary building covering 590 m², provide the living and researching area for 20 people during the Antarctic summer.

See also
 Antarctic Great Wall Station
 Antarctic Kunlun Station
 Antarctic Zhongshan Station
 Arctic Yellow River Station
 Crime in Antarctica
 List of Antarctic field camps
 List of Antarctic research stations
 Polar Research Institute of China
 Xuě Lóng

References

China and the Antarctic
Outposts of Antarctica
Polar Research Institute of China
2014 establishments in Antarctica